Aaron L. Woods is an American politician serving as a member of the Oregon State Senate for the 13th district. Elected in November 2022, he assumed office on January 9, 2023.

Early life and education 
Woods was raised in Chicago. He earned a Bachelor of Arts degree and Master of Business Administration from Marylhurst University.

Career 
Woods served in the United States Army. From 1996 to 1999, he worked as a senior manager at Tektronix. From 2000 to 2009, he worked in multiple positions at Xerox. Woods was elected to the Oregon State Senate in November 2022.

References 

Living people
Oregon state senators
Oregon Democrats
Marylhurst University alumni
Tektronix people
Xerox people
People from Wilsonville, Oregon
People from Clackamas County, Oregon
Year of birth missing (living people)